The African Artistic Gymnastics Championship (French: Championnats d'Afrique de gymnastique Artistique) is the top artistic gymnastics African tournament held every two years. It is governed by the African Gymnastics Association.

Summary of championships

See also
African Rhythmic Gymnastics Championships

References

External links
African Gymnastics Official 

 
Artistic gymnastics competitions
African championships
Gymnastics in Africa
Recurring sporting events established in 1990